The 2007 Baylor Bears football team (variously "Baylor", "BU", or the "Bears") represented Baylor University during the 2007 NCAA Division I FBS football season.  They played their home games at Floyd Casey Stadium in Waco, Texas.  The team was led by head coach Guy Morriss, who was fired on November 18, 2007, the day after the season ended. Art Briles was hired as Morriss' replacement on November 28, 2007.

Schedule

References

Baylor
Baylor Bears football seasons
Baylor Bears football